Ixalotriton is a genus of salamanders in the family Plethodontidae. 
It contains the following species:
 Ixalotriton niger
 Ixalotriton parva

 
Taxonomy articles created by Polbot